John Keith Hall (born 29 July 1934 in West Wickham) is an English former cricketer active from 1958 to 1962 who played for Surrey and Sussex. He appeared in 21 first-class matches as a righthanded batsman who bowled right arm fast medium. He scored 57 runs with a highest score of 22 and took 54 wickets with a best performance of five for 30.

Notes

1934 births
English cricketers
Surrey cricketers
Sussex cricketers
Marylebone Cricket Club cricketers
Free Foresters cricketers
Living people